Pleternica is a town in the region of Slavonia, Croatia,  southeast of Požega, in the Požega Valley (Požeška kotlina). The population of the municipality is 11,323, with 3,418 in Pleternica itself (2011).

Pleternica is located at the confluence of the river Londža into the Orljava river, at the foot of the mountain Požeška Gora; elevation .

Settlements
As of 2011, the municipality consists of 38 settlements:

 Ašikovci, population 91
 Bilice, population 188
 Blacko, population 226
 Brđani, population 49
 Bresnica, population 218
 Brodski Drenovac, population 686
 Bučje, population 318
 Buk, population 192
 Bzenica, population 96
 Ćosinac, population 54
 Frkljevci, population 345
 Gradac, population 937
 Kadanovci, population 213
 Kalinić, population 59
 Knežci, population 61
 Komorica, population 188
 Kuzmica, population 454
 Lakušija, population 78
 Mali Bilač, population 21
 Mihaljevići, population 2
 Novoselci, population 195
 Pleternica, population 3,418
 Pleternički Mihaljevci, population 15
 Poloje, population 87
 Požeška Koprivnica, population 246
 Ratkovica, population 224
 Resnik, population 307
 Sesvete, population 128
 Srednje Selo, population 285
 Sulkovci, population 537
 Svilna, population 139
 Trapari, population 178
 Tulnik, population 22
 Vesela, population 159
 Viškovci, population 234
 Vrčin Dol, population 2
 Zagrađe, population 492
 Zarilac, population 176

See also
 Pleter 91 submachine gun was named after this town.

References

Slavonia
Cities and towns in Croatia
Populated places in Požega-Slavonia County